The Mr. Men Show (sometimes referred to as Mr. Men Little Miss or simply Mr. Men) is an animated children's television series based on the original series of Mr. Men books created by English author and illustrator Roger Hargreaves—later with his son Adam Hargreaves. Adapted from the published source material into a variety program—unlike the original basis for the show, it features comedy sketches (primarily), pantomimes, dance numbers, and music videos.

The series aired on Channel 5's Milkshake! in the United Kingdom, and the United States both on Cartoon Network and Boomerang.

Summary
Based on the classic children's book series Mr. Men and Little Miss, the show takes place in the fictional town of Dillydale in the mythical continent of Misterland. The show revolves around the characters from the books (though a few of the characters were made for the show) and their adventures in Dillydale. Unlike the books (which featured characters such as Mr. Tickle, Mr. Bump, Mr. Happy, Mr. Strong, Mr. Tall, Little Miss Bossy, Little Miss Sunshine, Little Miss Tiny, Little Miss Giggles, and Little Miss Chatterbox as major characters), the TV show features the more minor characters more prominently (such as Little Miss Curious, Mr. Grumpy, and Mr. Lazy). Most of the episodes are not based on the books but are, in fact, new stories. There are also several changes to the TV show.

Episodes

Voice cast

American voices
 Alicyn Packard - Little Miss Naughty, Little Miss Sunshine and Little Miss Whoops
 Cheryl Chase - Little Miss Bossy and Little Miss Curious
 Godfrey - Mr. Stubborn and Mr. Tall
 Jeff Stewart - Mr. Tickle
 Joey D'Auria - Mr. Persnickety/Mr. Fussy, Mr. Rude, Mr. Scatterbrain and Narrator
 Katie Leigh - Little Miss Chatterbox, Little Miss Daredevil and Little Miss Helpful
 Paul Greenberg - Mr. Bump and Mr. Quiet
 Peter Rida Michail - Mr. Messy
 Phil Lollar - Mr. Lazy, Mr. Small and Mr. Strong
 Prudence Alcott - Little Miss Calamity and Little Miss Magic
 Rebecca Fordstadt - Little Miss Giggles
 Richard Epcar - Mr. Noisy
 Rick Zieff - Mr. Nosy and Mr. Nervous
 Sam Gold - Mr. Bounce, Mr. Grumpy and Mr. Happy
 Susan Balboni - Little Miss Scary

British voices
 Alex Kelly - Little Miss Scary (Season 2) and Little Miss Bossy
 Aline Mowat - Little Miss Calamity
 Claire Morgan - Little Miss Curious and Little Miss Giggles
 Emma Tate - Little Miss Sunshine (Season 2), Little Miss Helpful (Season 2) and Little Miss Magic
 Jo Wyatt - Little Miss Helpful (Season 1), Little Miss Naughty (Season 1), Little Miss Scary (Season 1) and Little Miss Sunshine (Season 1)
 Joey D'Auria - Mr. Rude and Mr. Scatterbrain
 Keith Wickham - Mr. Small and Mr. Tall
 Lewis Macleod - Mr. Stubborn
 Rob Rackstraw - Mr. Happy (Season 2), Mr. Messy, Mr. Noisy, Mr. Pernickety/Mr. Fussy and Mr. Tickle
 Simon Callow - Narrator
 Simon Greenall - Mr. Happy (Season 1), Mr. Bounce, Mr. Bump, Mr. Grumpy, Mr. Quiet and Mr. Strong
 Steven Kynman - Mr. Nosey
 Teresa Gallagher - Little Miss Naughty (Season 2), Little Miss Chatterbox, Little Miss Daredevil and Little Miss Whoops
 Tim Whitnall - Mr. Lazy and Mr. Nervous

Staff credits
 Kate Boutilier and Eryk Casemiro - Executive producers
 Mark Risley - Director (co-director from "Radio/Supermarket" onwards)
 Darrell Van Citters - Co-director (from "Radio/Supermarket" onwards)
 Mike Hollingsworth - Storyboard artist

Production
The Mr. Men Show was produced in Los Angeles by Renegade Animation, who were well-known for producing Cartoon Network's Hi Hi Puffy AmiYumi, and Chorion in New York City and London for Five and Cartoon Network, respectively.

Adaptations
In 2008, some artistic license was taken in order to adapt the books for television, including name changes, design alterations, and the creation of several new characters. The same year, Mr. Rude, Mr. Quiet, Mr. Strong, Mr. Grumpy, Mr. Fussy, Little Miss Naughty, Little Miss Whoops, Mr. Messy, Little Miss Helpful, Mr. Small, Mr. Nosey, Mr. Jelly, Mr. Lazy, Little Miss Magic, Mr. Tall, Little Miss Bossy, Mr. Funny and Little Miss Curious had undergone re-imaginings, with Mr. Jelly furthermore being renamed to Mr. Nervous (although Mr. Nosey was renamed Mr. Nosy in the U.S. broadcast and, in Season 1, Mr. Fussy was renamed Mr. Persnickety in the U.S. broadcast and Mr. Pernickety in the U.K. broadcast). As well as this, Little Miss Calamity, Little Miss Daredevil, Mr. Scatterbrain, Mr. Stubborn, Little Miss Strong, Little Miss Persnickety/Little Miss Fussy and Mr. Metal were created exclusively for the television series. Aliens, horn-thrusted red spanglers, giant blue-bellied buzzards, crustaceans and other animals also appear in the show. Mr. Greedy, Mr. Sneeze, Mr. Topsy-Turvy, Mr. Silly, Mr. Snooty/Mr. Uppity, Mr. Daydream, Mr. Forgetful, Mr. Muddle, Mr. Impossible, Mr. Rush, Mr. Worry, Mr. Skinny, Mr. Mischief, Mr. Clever, Mr. Brave, Mr. Perfect, Mr. Cheerful, Little Miss Neat, Little Miss Tiny, Little Miss Trouble, Little Miss Shy, Little Miss Splendid, Little Miss Late, Little Miss Tidy, Little Miss Plump, Little Miss Fun, Little Miss Princess, Little Miss Star, Little Miss Bad, Little Miss Hug, Little Miss Lucky, Little Miss Fickle, Little Miss Fabulous and the Little Miss Twins were planned to be in the series as well, but they were never released.

Dillydale

In Roger Hargreaves' original book series, each of the Mr. Men and Little Miss characters were given a hometown: Happyland, Tiddletown, Nonsenseland, etc. In the television series, all of the characters live in the same city, the township of Dillydale. The name "Dillydale" was coined by series producer Peggy Regan. To commemorate the historic naming, Peggy was presented with a plaque and the honorary title of "The Mayor of Dillydale".

References

External links
 

2000s American animated television series
2000s American sketch comedy television series
2008 American television series debuts
2009 American television series endings
2000s British animated television series
2000s British television sketch shows
2008 British television series debuts
2009 British television series endings
2000s preschool education television series
American children's animated comedy television series
American flash animated television series
American television shows based on children's books
Cartoon Network original programming
Channel 5 (British TV channel) original programming
Boomerang (TV network) original programming
British children's animated comedy television series
British flash animated television series
British television shows based on children's books
American television series based on British television series
English-language television shows
Children's sketch comedy